is a former Japanese football player.

Playing career
Horinouchi was born in Saitama on October 26, 1979. After graduating from Tokyo Gakugei University, he joined the J1 League club Urawa Reds in 2002. He got an opportunity to play in 2003 and he played many matches as stopper in a three-backs defense from 2005. The Reds won the championship at the 2005 Emperor's Cup. At the Emperor's Cup Final, he scored the opening goal. In 2006, he became a regular player as left defender of a three-back defense with Keisuke Tsuboi and Marcus Tulio Tanaka and the Reds won the championship of the J1 League for the first time in the club's history. In 2007, the Reds won the championship of the AFC Champions League. Although he did not play as much in 2009, he played many matches as defensive midfielder. However he did not play at all in 2011. In 2012, he moved to the J2 League club Yokohama FC. Although he did not play much during the summer, he played as center back after that. In 2013, he moved to the J2 club Montedio Yamagata. He played many matches as center back. He retired at the end of the 2013 season.

Club statistics

*Includes other competitive competitions, including the Japanese Super Cup, A3 Champions Cup and J1 Promotion Play-offs.

Awards and honours

Club
Urawa Reds
AFC Champions League: 1
 2007
J1 League: 1
 2006
Emperor's Cup: 2
 2005, 2006
J.League Cup: 1
 2003
Japanese Super Cup: 1
 2006

References

External links

1979 births
Living people
Tokyo Gakugei University alumni
Association football people from Saitama Prefecture
Japanese footballers
J1 League players
J2 League players
Urawa Red Diamonds players
Yokohama FC players
Montedio Yamagata players
Association football defenders